The 1996 NCAA Division I Women's Golf Championships were contested at the 15th annual NCAA-sanctioned golf tournament to determine the individual and team national champions of women's Division I collegiate golf in the United States.

This was the first championship held exclusively for Division I programs. A separate combined championship for Division II and Division III programs was also held for the first time this year, held in Allendale, Michigan and won by Methodist.

The tournament was held at the Bel Air Country Club in Los Angeles, California.

Arizona won the team championship, the Wildcats' first. Arizona defeated San Jose State in a sudden-death playoff to win the title. 

Marisa Baena, from Arizona, won the individual title.

Individual results

Individual champion
 Marisa Baena, Arizona (296, +8)

Team leaderboard

 † = Won tie-breaker
 DC = Defending champion
 Debut appearance

References

NCAA Women's Golf Championship
Golf in California
NCAA Women's Golf Championship
NCAA Women's Golf Championship
NCAA Women's Golf Championship